The Constitutional Court of the Republic of Moldova represents the sole body of constitutional jurisdiction in the Republic of Moldova, autonomous and independent from the executive, the legislature and the judiciary. 

The task of the Constitutional Court is to guarantee the supremacy of the Constitution, to ensure the principle of separation of State powers into the legislative, executive and judicial branches, to guarantee the observance of the State's responsibility towards the citizen and the citizen's responsibility towards the State. 

Upon request, the Constitutional Court interprets the Constitution and undertakes the review of constitutionality of the Parliament's laws and decisions, the decrees of the President and the acts of the Government.

The court's existence was provided for by the Constitution, adopted in July 1994. It was created in February 1995.

Presidents
The following judges have served as presidents of the court:

Notes

External links
www.constcourt.md - official site

Government of Moldova
Moldova
1995 establishments in Moldova
Courts and tribunals established in 1995